The Oppo F1 is an Android smartphone manufactured by Oppo Electronics that was released in January 2016. The phone featured a  touchscreen display, Android 5.1 (Lollipop) operating system, and microSD card support for up to an additional 256GB of storage. This is the first phone in Oppo's F series.

Specifications

Hardware
The Oppo F1 has a  touchscreen display with 720 x 1280 resolution. It has a 13MP main camera and an 8MP selfie camera, along with a Screen Flash feature that lights up the screen to light up selfies. The phone comes with 16GB of internal storage, 3GB of RAM, and expandable storage up to 256GB via a microSD card. It also has a Snapdragon 616 CPU. The phone itself measures  X  X  and weighs .

Software
The Oppo F1 came with Android 5.1 (Lollipop) with ColorOS 2.1.

See also
Oppo phones
Android (operating system)

References

F1
Android (operating system) devices
Mobile phones introduced in 2016
Discontinued smartphones